Waniphok (วณิพก) was the third album by Thai rock band Carabao.  It was released in 1983.

Track listing

1981 albums
Carabao (band) albums